Southend West is a constituency in the House of Commons of the UK Parliament. The seat is currently held by Anna Firth who won the 2022 by-election, following the murder of the incumbent MP, David Amess.

History
The constituency was created for the 1950 general election under the Representation of the People Act 1948, when the Parliamentary Borough of Southend-on-Sea was split in two.

Since creation, the seat has been held every election by the Conservative Party, with majorities ranging from 5.7% during the Labour Landslide of 1997 to 43.4% in 1955. It has historically been seen by pundits as a safe Conservative seat.

Because four members of the Guinness family have held the seat (or its predecessor, Southend) it has been dubbed in political analyses in the media as "Guinness-on-Sea".

The seat was represented by David Amess for 24 years, from 1997 to 15 October 2021, when he was stabbed and killed. Amess was previously the MP for Basildon from 1983. A by-election was held to elect a replacement MP. In a similar vein to the subsequent by-election following the murder of Labour MP Jo Cox in 2016, all major contender parties stated they would not field candidates in opposition to the Conservative nominee.

Boundaries and boundary changes 

1950–1955: The County Borough of Southend-on-Sea wards of Chalkwell, Eastwood, Leigh, Milton, Prittlewell, St Clements, Victoria, and Westborough.

Formed primarily from western parts of the abolished Parliamentary Borough of Southend-on-Sea.

1955–1983: The County Borough of Southend-on-Sea wards of Blenheim, Chalkwell, Eastwood, Leigh, Prittlewell, St Clement's, Southbourne, and Westborough.

Realignment of boundary with Southend East.

1983–2010:  The Borough of Southend-on-Sea wards of Belfairs, Blenheim, Chalkwell, Eastwood, Leigh, Prittlewell, and Westborough.

Marginal changes following the redistribution of wards in the Borough of Southend-on-Sea.

2010–present:  The Borough of Southend-on-Sea wards of Belfairs, Blenheim Park, Chalkwell, Eastwood Park, Leigh, Prittlewell, St Laurence, Westborough, and West Leigh.

Further marginal changes were due to a redistribution of local authority wards.

The constituency comprises a small part of the West of Southend-on-Sea, and includes Leigh-on-Sea and Westcliff-on-Sea. It is bounded to the North and East by Rochford and Southend East, to the North by Rayleigh and Wickford, to the West by Castle Point, and to the South by the very end of the Thames estuary.

Constituency profile
 
Registered jobseekers were in November 2012 close to the national average of 3.8%, at 3.5% of the population based on a statistical compilation by The Guardian.

Leigh-on-Sea has a number of Liberal Democrat councillors, whilst Eastwood Park has voted for the Lib Dems on occasion, and there is some Labour strength in Westborough (their strongest ward in the constituency), Blenheim Park and St Laurence, however the remaining areas are predominantly Conservative.

Members of Parliament

Elections

Elections in the 2020s

Elections in the 2010s

Jack Monroe had previously been standing for the National Health Action Party, before withdrawing their candidacy on 11 May 2017, citing death threats and concern for their health.

Elections in the 2000s

Elections in the 1990s

Elections in the 1980s

Elections in the 1970s

Elections in the 1960s

Elections in the 1950s

See also 
 List of parliamentary constituencies in Essex

Notes

References

External links
 Southend West Liberal Democrat Prospective MP
 Southend West UKIP Prospective MP
 Southend Liberal Democrats
 Southend West Conservatives

Parliamentary constituencies in Essex
Constituencies of the Parliament of the United Kingdom established in 1950
Politics of Southend-on-Sea